The 2011 season was the 106th season of competitive football in Norway.

The season began on 18 March 2011 for Tippeligaen, 3 April 2011 for Adeccoligaen, with 2. divisjon and 3. divisjon both starting six days later on 9 April 2011. 2. divisjon and 3. divisjon ended on 22 October 2011 while Adeccoligaen ended eight days later on 30 October 2011 and Tippeligaen finished on 27 November 2011.

Events of the season

January
8 January 2011: Thorbjørn Svenssen, Norway's most capped player with 104 games, dies from a stroke at the age of 86.

August
13 August 2011: Start beat Adeccoliga side Alta 1–0 and through to the semi final of 2011 Norwegian Football Cup. 2009 winners Aalesund is heading for another Cup-victory after beating Rosenborg at home.

14 August 2011: Fredrikstad FK denies Ole Gunnar Solskjær success in the Norwegian Football Cup in his first year as a manager in Norway. Molde lost 2–3 at Fredrikstad Stadion after extra time. In Stavanger, Brann knocked out Viking on penalties shoot-out, with Piotr Leciejewski saving three of Vikings four penalties.

September
2 September 2011: With a late penalty goal from Mohammed Abdellaoue, Norway won 1–0 against Iceland, keeping Norway joint top of UEFA EURO 2012 qualifying Group H with two matches remaining.

6 September 2011: Denmark won 2–0 against Norway in Parken, after two goals from Nicklas Bendtner. The chances for Drillo's men to reach UEFA EURO 2012 is now very small.

10 September 2011: Notodden secured promotion to 1. divisjon with six matches left to play, after beating Førde 2–1 in Førde.

21 September 2011: Brann reach the Cup final after a 2–0 win against Fredrikstad at Fredrikstad Stadion.

21 September 2011: With an unlucky own goal, Haraldur Freyr Guðmundsson sent his old team, Aalesund to the Cup final, two years after they won the Cup in 2009, after beating Start in the other semifinal.

October
2 October 2011: Molde move closer to the Tippeliga title with a 2–0 win against title challengers Tromsø, and becomes the first team this season to win at Alfheim Stadion this season.

19 October 2011: Hønefoss took another step towards promotion to 2012 Tippeligaen with a 2–1 win against Asker in 1. divisjon, while Tom Nordlie and Kongsvinger ruined Sandefjord's chances for promotion.

Men's football

Promotion and relegation

League season

Tippeligaen

1. divisjon (Adeccoligaen)

2. divisjon (Fair Play-ligaen)

Group 1

Group 2

Group 3

Group 4

3. divisjon

Norwegian Cup

Final

Women's football

League season

Toppserien

1. divisjon

Norwegian Women's Cup

Final
 Røa 2–2 (aet) (6–7 on penalties) Stabæk

Men's UEFA competitions
These are the results of the Norwegian teams in European competitions during the 2011 season. (Norwegian team score displayed first)

* For group games in Champions League or Europa League, score in home game is displayed
** For group games in Champions League or Europa League, score in away game is displayed

UEFA Women's Champions League

Knockout stage

Round of 32

|}

National teams

Norway men's national football team

UEFA Euro 2012 qualifying

Group H

During this season, the Norway national football team were to play the last five of their eight scheduled Group H qualifying matches for Euro 2012.

Friendlies
The Norway national football team also participated in four friendly matches in 2011.

Norway women's national football team

Managerial changes

Notes and references

 
Seasons in Norwegian football